Management & Organizational History is a peer-reviewed academic journal that publishes papers five times a year in the field of management studies, especially with regard to historical approaches to the study of management, organizations and organizing. Its editors-in-chief are Michael Rowlinson (Queen Mary, University of London) and Roy Stager Jacques (Massey University). It was established in 2006 and is currently published by SAGE Publications.

Abstracting and indexing 
Management and Organizational History is abstracted and indexed in Scopus.

External links 
 

SAGE Publishing academic journals
English-language journals
Business and management journals
Publications established in 2006